Radenín is a municipality and village in Tábor District in the South Bohemian Region of the Czech Republic. It has about 500 inhabitants.

Administrative parts
Villages of Bítov, Hroby, Kozmice, Lažany, Nuzbely and Terezín are administrative parts of Radenín.

Notable people
Zuzana Černínová of Harasov, (1600/1601–1654), letter writer; died here
Humprecht Jan Czernin (1628–1682), noble and diplomat

References

Villages in Tábor District